Lauren Melo (born August 30, 1966) is an American businesswoman and politician who is the Representative for District 80 in the Florida House of Representatives. Melo assumed office November 3, 2020.

Background 
Melo was born and raised in Naples, Florida and graduated from Barron G. Collier High School. In 1991, Melo established a small trucking company, eventually growing the fleet to one hundred trucks. Melo has since worked as a real estate broker in Naples.

Elections

References 

Living people
People from Naples, Florida
Republican Party members of the Florida House of Representatives
Businesspeople from Florida
1966 births
21st-century American politicians
Women state legislators in Florida
21st-century American women politicians
20th-century American businesspeople
20th-century American businesswomen